The 1973 Philadelphia Eagles season was the franchise's 41st in the National Football League. Although they improved upon their 2–11–1 record of the previous season, they failed to complete a winning record for the seventh consecutive season and failed to reach the playoffs for the thirteenth straight year.

Offseason 
At the end of the 1972 season, Eagles head coach Ed Khayat was fired. Mike McCormack, who had been a Washington Redskins assistant coach from 1965 to 1972, was hired in his place

The Eagles moved their training camp from Albright College in Reading, Pennsylvania, to Widener University in Chester, Pennsylvania, a short distance from Veterans Stadium.

NFL Draft

Roster

Regular season 

 On September 23, the Eagles and the New York Giants played in the final Giants game at Yankee Stadium. The game resulted in a 23–23 tie.
 In 1973, Roman Gabriel led the NFL with 3,219 yards and 23 touchdown passes, for which he was awarded the NFL Comeback Player of the Year Award.

Schedule 

Note: Intra-division opponents are in bold text.

Game summaries

Week 5

Week 8

Standings

Awards and honors 
 Roman Gabriel, quarterback, NFL Leader, 3,219 passing yards
 Roman Gabriel, NFL Leader, 23 touchdown passes
 Roman Gabriel, NFL Comeback Player of the Year Award

Notes

References 

 
 1973 Eagles on jt-sw.com
 1973 Eagles on Eagles.net

Philadelphia Eagles seasons
Philadelphia Eagles
Philadel